Chloroclystis acervicosta is a moth in the  family Geometridae. It is found on Java.

References

Moths described in 1958
acervicosta
Moths of Indonesia